Fathabad (also Romanized as Fatḩābād; also known as Dabestān-e Abolfatḩ and Faraḩābād) is a village in Fathabad Rural District of the Central District of Khatam County, Yazd province, Iran. At the 2006 National Census, its population was 681 in 170 households. The following census in 2011 counted 687 people in 163 households. The latest census in 2016 showed a population of 497 people in 141 households; it was the largest village in its rural district.

References 

Khatam County

Populated places in Yazd Province

Populated places in Khatam County